Ulrich Falk (born 14 August 1950) is a Swiss judoka. He competed in the men's open category event at the 1972 Summer Olympics.

References

1950 births
Living people
Swiss male judoka
Olympic judoka of Switzerland
Judoka at the 1972 Summer Olympics
Place of birth missing (living people)